Käpylä (Finnish) or Kottby (Swedish) is a railway station in the Käpylä district of Helsinki, Finland. It is located between the stations of Pasila and Oulunkylä, along the main railroad track from Helsinki to Riihimäki, about 6 km north from the Helsinki Central railway station.

History 

The Kottby station was opened as a pysäkki (a station of lower significance, translating to "stop") in 1910, and its first station house was completed in the same year. At the time, it was situated on a nigh entirely uninhabited area on the northern outskirts of Helsinki that had been annexed to the city just four years prior. At this time, the first few kilometers of the Helsinki–Riihimäki railway ran from the Helsinki central station to the Fredriksberg (currently Pasila) lower rail yard, via the current location of the Ilmala depot. This changed in 1920 as the Fredriksberg station was relocated further east, along with the rest of the Helsinki–Kottby segment.

In 1922, a new two-floor station building was constructed; the old, smaller station was moved to Nuppulinna. In 1924, the Panuntie overpass was constructed. It was part of the Tuusulantie road until the motorway section of national road 45 was completed midway through the 1960s. The station had its Finnish name – Käpylä – officialized in 1925.

The station lies quite some distance away to the northwest of the suburbs of Käpylä, the bulk of which were built in the interwar period. The station building fell out of use as Käpylä was made an unmanned halt in 1963; it was dismantled at some point towards the end of the 1970s. The station was connected with the Ilmala depot in 1969 with the construction of a siding.

As of 2005, Käpylä has been one part of the split railway operating point of Helsinki. The others currently include the passenger stations of Helsinki, Pasila, Oulunkylä and Ilmala, the Pasila freight and car loading stations, the Ilmala depot and the Helsinki Kivihaka crossover.

Services 

On the Helsinki commuter rail network, Käpylä is served by lines K to Kerava, I and P to the Helsinki Airport, and nighttime line T to Riihimäki. All of these lines make stops at all stations on their routes.

Bus stops bearing the station's name are found on Panuntie street, crossing over the platforms on the eastern side of the station, as well as on the Tuusulanväylä highway and its interchange ramps on the western side. Both sides also have city bike terminals, positioned right by the respective pedestrian overpasses. The Käpylä station, as well as its surrounding bus stops, belong to HSL fare zone .

External links 
 Train arrivals and departures at Käpylä on Finrail

References

Railway stations in Helsinki
Railway stations opened in 1910